St Bosseratti aka Dingaani Whayo (born December 1, 1984), is a Malawian composer and record producer.

Bosseratti has written and produced hit singles for South African musicians, Pitch Black Afro (Zonke Bonke) and Ifani (Ewe).

References

 Discography on Discogs

External links 

1984 births
Living people
Malawian composers
Malawian record producers